The New Establishment were a Jamaican reggae band active from 1972 to 1974 on the Bongo Man label. Their songs included "Rockfort Rock".

References

Jamaican reggae musical groups